The UCL Institute for Global Health (IGH) is an academic department of the Faculty of Population Health Sciences of University College London (UCL) and is located in London, United Kingdom. It was founded in 1964 by David Morley as the Tropical Child Health Unit. Originally a unit within the UCL Institute of Child Health, IGH became independent in August 2013 with Professor Anthony Costello as director.

In 2016, Professor Ibrahim Abubakar became the new director of the UCL Institute for Global Health, and in 2017 the UCL Research Department of Infection and Population Health merged with IGH to form the current department.

In July 2022, Professor Shabbar Jaffar will take the role of new director of the IGH.

The Institute for Global Health offers various teaching programme options, with 176 students registered on IGH PGT programmes in the 2018–19 academic year, as well as short course and tropEd students.  Roughly 50 research degree students are based at the institute.

Global health research is conducted by Institute staff in more than 50 countries worldwide, in collaboration with UK and overseas partners.

The institute is situated across three sites in London, with some staff based or frequently overseas.  The institute has over 150 staff, including 19 professors, of which 13 are female.  The institute has held the Athena Swan Silver Award since 2017.

IGH Centres 
In 2017 the institute established ten centres:

References

Medical research institutes in the United Kingdom
University College London